Reval is the former name of Tallinn, the capital of Estonia.

Reval may also refer to:

General
Reval (company), an American cloud computing provider
Reval (cigarette), a German brand
SS Reval (later known as SS Memel), a cargo ship, 1925–1977
Estonian Regiment "Reval", a military formation of the Waffen-SS, 1944–1945

People
Allan Reval (1913–2005), Australian rules footballer
Else Reval (1893–1978), German film actress
Gabrielle Réval (1869-1938), French novelist, essayist

See also
Revala (9th–13th century), a medieval Estonian county 
Bishopric of Reval (1240–1560), in Duchy of Estonia, in Kingdom of Denmark
Governorate of Reval (1721–1917, later known as Governorate of Estonia), in Russian Empire
Kreis Reval (also known as Kreis Harrien), in Governorate of Estonia, Russian Empire
Battle of Reval (1602), during the Polish–Swedish War (1600–1611)
Siege of Reval (1710), during the Great Northern War (1700–1721)
Battle of Reval (1790), during the Russo-Swedish War (1788–1790)